Net.Data is a programming language by IBM used largely for database-backed web applications. 

It is a server-side scripting language that extends Web servers by enabling the dynamic generation of Web pages using data from a variety of data sources. The data sources can include relational and non-relational database management systems.

References

Domain-specific programming languages
IBM software